Euxesta rubida is a species of ulidiid or picture-winged fly in the genus Euxesta of the family Ulidiidae. It was described by Charles Howard Curran in 1935.

References

rubida
Insects described in 1935
Taxa named by Charles Howard Curran